"Po Tebe" (in Macedonian Cyrillic: По Тебе) is the second released single from the fifth studio album named Po Tebe by the Macedonian singer Toše Proeski.  The single was released not just in Macedonia, but subsequently in the other ex-Yugoslav countries under the Serbian title "Pratim Te". This song sounds like Enrique Iglesias' song "Bailamos".

2005 singles
2005 songs